Fatmire "Lira" Alushi (born 1 April 1988) is a German former professional footballer who played as an attacking midfielder for the Germany national team. She placed third in 2010 FIFA Ballon d'Or competition, an annual award given to the world's best player.

Club career

Alushi began her career at DJK/VfL Giesenkirchen. From 1997 to 2004, she played for FSC Mönchengladbach, before moving to the Bundesliga side and joining FCR 2001 Duisburg. She made her Bundesliga debut in September 2004 for the club and scored her first goal one month later. Alushi immediately became a regular starter for Duisburg. She was runner-up with Duisburg for four seasons in a row from 2005 to 2008. During the 2008–09 season, Alushi won the UEFA Women's Champions League. She also claimed the 2009 German Cup title, where she scored in the final.

After five seasons at Duisburg, Alushi moved to league rivals 1. FFC Turbine Potsdam for the 2009–10 season. At her new club, she won the Bundesliga title in 2010 and 2011. In the 2009–10 season, Potsdam also claimed the inaugural UEFA Women's Champions League title, with Bajramaj scoring during the penalty shoot-out in the final. One year later, Potsdam again made it to the final, but lost against Olympique Lyonnais.

Alushi came in third place for the 2010 FIFA Ballon d'Or award. She has announced to move to 1. FFC Frankfurt for the 2011–12 season. The transfer is the most expensive in women's Bundesliga history.

In 2014, she transferred to Paris.

Alushi announced her retirement on 28 February 2017.

International career
Alushi made her debut for Germany’s senior national team in October 2005 against Scotland. One year later, she won 2006 UEFA Women's Under-19 Championship at junior level. At the 2006 FIFA U-20 Women's World Championship, the German team was eliminated in the quarter-finals. Alushi started in all four of the team's matches and scored three goals during the tournament.

She won her first major international title at the 2007 FIFA World Cup. She was a reserve player for Germany, appearing in four games, including the tournament's final, in which she won the corner that let to Germany's second goal. One year later, Alushi claimed bronze with Germany at the 2008 Summer Olympics. She was brought on after 62 minutes in the third-place play-off and scored both goals in Germany's 2–0 win over Japan. In 2009, Alushi won her first European trophy at the 2009 European Championship, where Germany claimed its seventh title. She was also called up for Germany's 2011 FIFA World Cup squad.

Personal life
Alushi's parents Ismet and Ganimete, who are Kosovo-Albanians, moved their family from Istok, Kosovo to Germany in 1993. In October 2009, she published her autobiography Mein Tor ins Leben – Vom Flüchtling zur Weltmeisterin (My Gate into Life – From Refugee to World Champion [wordplay: German "Tor" translates to both "Goal"/"Gate"]). 

In June 2011, Alushi began dating fellow footballer Enis Alushi. Both their fathers are working together as police officers in Kosovo.  The couple announced their engagement the following year. Shortly after, in September 2012, both suffered ACL injuries in matches within 72 hours of each other. The couple got married in December 2013. Following the 2015 UEFA Women's Champions League Final, Alushi announced that she was pregnant and would be forced to miss the 2015 FIFA World Cup in Canada. She stated that she expected to get back to the pitch eventually but that "there are things in life that are simply more important than football".

Career statistics
Scores and results list Germany's goal tally first, score column indicates score after each Alushi goal.

Honours
FCR 2001 Duisburg
UEFA Women's Cup: 2008–09
Bundesliga: runner-up 2004–05, 2005–06, 2006–07, 2007–08
DFB-Pokal: 2008–09; runner-up 2006–07

Turbine Potsdam
UEFA Women's Champions League: 2009–10
Bundesliga: 2009–10, 2010–11

FFC Frankfurt
UEFA Women's Champions League: runner-up 2011–12
DFB-Pokal: 2013–14
FIFA World Cup: 2007
UEFA European Championship: 2009, 2013
Olympic bronze medal: 2008
UEFA Women's U-19 Championship: 2006
Algarve Cup: 2014

Individual
Women's Footballer of the Year: 2011
Silbernes Lorbeerblatt: 2007
FIFA Ballon d'Or: third place 2010

References

External links

 
 
 
 
 
 
 
 
 

1988 births
Living people
Association footballers' wives and girlfriends
German women's footballers
Germany women's international footballers
German expatriate women's footballers
Expatriate women's footballers in France
Women's association football midfielders
1. FFC Frankfurt players
1. FFC Turbine Potsdam players
2007 FIFA Women's World Cup players
2011 FIFA Women's World Cup players
Division 1 Féminine players
FCR 2001 Duisburg players
FIFA Women's World Cup-winning players
Footballers at the 2008 Summer Olympics
German expatriate sportspeople in France
German people of Albanian descent
Kosovan emigrants to Germany
Kosovan expatriates in Germany
Kosovo Albanians
Medalists at the 2008 Summer Olympics
Olympic bronze medalists for Germany
Olympic medalists in football
Olympic footballers of Germany
Paris Saint-Germain Féminine players
People from Istog
UEFA Women's Championship-winning players
Yugoslav emigrants to Germany
Sportspeople from Peja
Association football midfielders